The 580s decade ran from January 1, 580, to December 31, 589.

Significant people
 Pope Gregory I
 Bahrām Chōbin
 Fredegund
 Guntram
 Emperor Wen of Sui
 Yan Zhitui

References

Bibliography